Melissa Murray (born October 3, 1974) is an American politician and a Democratic member of the Rhode Island Senate representing District 24 since January 2019. She was on the Woonsocket City Council for two terms from 2013 to 2018.

References 

1974 births
Living people
Politicians from Woonsocket, Rhode Island
Democratic Party Rhode Island state senators
21st-century American politicians
21st-century American women politicians
Rhode Island city council members
Women city councillors in Rhode Island
Women state legislators in Rhode Island